The men's Greco-Roman 82 kilograms is a competition featured at the 2022 U23 World Wrestling Championships, and was held in Pontevedra, Spain on 18 and 19 October 2022. The qualification rounds were held on 18 October while medal matches were held on the 2nd day of the competition. A total of 24 wrestlers competed in this event, limited to athletes whose body weight was less than 72 kilograms. 

This Greco-Roman wrestling competition consists of a single-elimination tournament, with a repechage used to determine the winner of two bronze medals. The two finalists face off for gold and silver medals. Each wrestler who loses to one of the two finalists moves into the repechage, culminating in a pair of bronze medal matches featuring the semifinal losers each facing the remaining repechage opponent from their half of the bracket.

Results
Legend
F — Won by fall
R — Retired
 WO — Won by walkover

Final

Top half

Bottom half

Repechage

Final standing

References

External links
Official website

Men's Greco-Roman 82 kg